Edward M. Daily (September 7, 1862 – October 21, 1891) was a Major League Baseball player. He played seven seasons in the majors, from  until , for the Philadelphia Phillies, Washington Nationals, Columbus Solons, Brooklyn Gladiators, New York Giants, Louisville Colonels, and Washington Statesmen.

He won 26 games, fifth in the National League. In , he went 16–9, but was already starting to play more often as an outfielder, appearing in 56 games in the outfield and batting .227. From  until , he was almost exclusively an outfielder, but in  he pitched in 41 games for three teams, winning 18 games. He played part of one more season in the majors, but died shortly after the end of the season.

References

See also
List of Major League Baseball career stolen bases leaders

1862 births
1891 deaths
Major League Baseball pitchers
Baseball players from Providence, Rhode Island
Washington Nationals (1886–1889) players
Columbus Solons players
Brooklyn Gladiators players
Louisville Colonels players
Washington Statesmen players
Philadelphia Quakers players
New York Giants (NL) players
19th-century baseball players
Harrisburg Olympics players
Waterbury (minor league baseball) players